Blonde on Blonde was a girl group formed in 1978 by the British glamour models Nina Carter and Jilly Johnson. After some success, particularly in Japan, they disbanded in the 1980s. Their most successful single was a cover version of Led Zeppelin's "Whole Lotta Love". They featured in a cameo role in the 1979 British thriller film The Golden Lady and appear on the film's soundtrack album. Their album And How! was released in 1979.

References 

English girl groups
Musical groups established in 1978
Musical groups established in the 1980s
Chrysalis Records artists
1978 establishments in the United Kingdom
1980s disestablishments in the United Kingdom